Patrick Sarniak is an American musician, songwriter and actor from Detroit, Michigan. Sarniak is known for being a guitarist in the world music band Muruga Cosmic Boogie (originally known as Muruga & The Cosmic Hoedown Band), and for his collaborations with Muruga Booker and Tony "Strat" Thomas.

Sarniak grew up in Dearborn, Michigan, and began playing guitar as a teenager, performing in many local bands through the years. In 2013, he began playing guitar with Muruga Cosmic Boogie, alongside Tony "Strat" Thomas.

Patrick Sarniak has performed on stage or has been involved in studio recording projects that include David Winans II, Dwight Adams, Barry Harris, James Carter, Perry Robinson, Steven “Muruga” Booker, and George Clinton. He also performed on stage or has been in projects with members of  Kid Rock, Public Enemy, Ted Nugent’s Amboy Dukes, Mitch Ryder’s Detroit and The Detroit Wheels, and various members of George Clinton's P-Funk All Stars.

In 2015, he performed with Muruga Cosmic Boogie for the Don Was Detroit All-Star Revue at the Concert of Colors (at Orchestra Hall in Detroit, Michigan) performing Maggot Brain.

Sarniak has been involved in several projects that have been nominated for Detroit Music awards: Outstanding National Small / Independent Label Distribution Album (2016), Outstanding Urban Artist/Group (2016), Outstanding World Artist/Group (2017), Outstanding World Recording (2017), Outstanding World Artist/Group (2018), Outstanding World Artist/Group (2019).

Patrick Sarniak is an actor, known for his appearances in movies including Who Killed Aliyah? (2012), Approaching Midnight (2013) and Into the Storm (2014).

Discography
2009 - Dead City Prophets (with Ron Cooke) - Saturday Night
2013 - Muruga & The Cosmic Hoedown Band – Changing The Sound of Your Room
2014 - Lucky - Muruga (Shelly "Lucky" Stein & Muruga Booker) - Rants, Rhythms & Rhymes
2014 - Muruga-Robinson Ensemble (Muruga Booker & Perry Robinson)  - Live at Sage Court Studio
2015 - Muruga Cosmic Boogie meets George Clinton & P-Funk All-Stars - The Fathership - Mothership World Connection
2016 – Muruga Cosmic Boogie (feat. P-Funk All-Stars & more) – At The Wormhole Cafe
2016 - Muruga Cosmic Boogie - Harmonious World
2019 - Muruga Cosmic Boogie - Trail Mix Boogie
2019 - Muruga Cosmic Boogie - MURUGA From Woodstock 1969 to Woodstock 50th in the D 2019

References

External links

American male actors
American male film actors
American male guitarists
American multi-instrumentalists
American people of Polish descent
American rock guitarists
Guitarists from Detroit
Lead guitarists
Living people
Male actors from Detroit
Male actors from Michigan
People from Highland Park, Michigan
People from Dearborn, Michigan
People from Wayne County, Michigan
Rhythm guitarists
Songwriters from Michigan
20th-century American guitarists
20th-century American male musicians
21st-century American guitarists
21st-century American male musicians
1961 births
American male songwriters